Franck Barre is a paralympic athlete from France competing mainly in category F45 long jump events.

Franck competed in Sydney in the 2000 Summer Paralympics.  There he competed in the long jump and won the silver medal in the F44 class.

References

External links 
 

Paralympic athletes of France
Athletes (track and field) at the 2000 Summer Paralympics
Paralympic silver medalists for France
Living people
French male long jumpers
Medalists at the 2000 Summer Paralympics
Year of birth missing (living people)
Paralympic medalists in athletics (track and field)
21st-century French people
20th-century French people
Long jumpers with limb difference
Paralympic long jumpers